Kim Yoo-jin is a Korean name consisting of the family name Kim and the given name Yoo-jin, and may refer to:

 Kim Yoo-jin (director) (born 1950), South Korean male film director
 Eugene (actress) (born 1981), South Korean actress
 Kim Yoo-jin (footballer, born 1981), South Korean female footballer
 Kim Yoo-jin (footballer, born 1983), South Korean male footballer
 Uee (born 1988), South Korean female singer
 Kim Yoo-jin (video game player) (born 1993), South Korean male eSports player
 Kim You-jin, a member of South Korean boy band KNK
 Kim Yu-jin (taekwondo)
 Kim Yu-jin (footballer, born 1979)